Shelal-e Ali (also Romanized as Shelāl ‘Alī and Shelāl-e ‘Alī; also known as Shelalvand (Persian: شلالوند), also Romanized as Shelālvand) is a village in Itivand-e Shomali Rural District, Kakavand District, Delfan County, Lorestan Province, Iran. At the 2006 census, its population was 49, in 11 families.

References 

Towns and villages in Delfan County